Joseph Jefferson  was Archdeacon of Colchester from 1812 until his death on 28 December 1821.

At the time of his death he was Rector of Weeley and Vicar of Witham. His son, also called Joseph, was an Anglican clergyman.

Notes

19th-century English Anglican priests
Archdeacons of Colchester
1821 deaths